Shahriyar III ibn Jamshid was the Baduspanid ruler of Ruyan and Rustamdar from 937 to 949. He belonged to a distant branch of the family, descended from Afridun ibn Karan. After a period of instability and dynastic struggles, Shahriyar emerged victorious and took over the throne, thus establishing a new line known as the Shahriyarids, succeeding the previous Afridunids. The new line notably wielded the pre-Islamic title of ustandar, originally an administrative title of provincial governors under the Sasanian Empire.

References

Sources 
 

10th-century monarchs in the Middle East
10th-century Iranian people
Baduspanids